Danalpur is a village in Hindaun Block of Rajasthan, India. It is located near Shri Mahavirji, which is a famous Jain religious place and is well connected to Jaipur ( the capital of Rajasthan) through State Highway. The population mainly consists of Meenas.

Distances from various cities:
Hindaun City: 17.5  km
Jaipur: 140  km
Shri Mahavirji: 2  km
Karauli: 30  km

Hindaun Block
Villages in Karauli district